Kolovesi National Park is a national park in the Etelä-Savo region of Finland. It protects e.g. the habitat of the critically endangered Saimaa Ringed Seal. Typical of the rugged scenery of Kolovesi, formed by the ice age, are craggy cliffs rising from the water. Cave paintings have been discovered in the area. Motor boats are prohibited in the area. Kayaking, canoeing, and rowing and facilitated, and there are also several marked hiking paths in the area.

See also 
 List of national parks of Finland
 Protected areas of Finland

References

External links
 Outdoors.fi – Kolovesi National Park

Protected areas established in 1990
1990 establishments in Finland
Enonkoski
Heinävesi
National parks of Finland